National Geographic is a German pay television channel dedicated to documentaries and factual programmes.

The channel was launched on 1 November 2004 on Kabel Deutschland's digital platform, broadcasting 24 hours per day from the start. The channel also launched on other cable networks such as Unitymedia, Kabel BW, and UPC Cablecom

On 16 May 2009, National Geographic Channel replaced Discovery Geschichte on the Premiere satellite platform. This was followed by the launch of the German Nat Geo Wild when it replaced Animal Planet on Premiere on 1 July, a few days before Premiere was rebranded and became Sky Deutschland. National Geographic Channel HD was also launched on Sky in July 2009. Distribution of the Nat Geo People program derivative was discontinued in German-speaking countries as of September 12, 2017.

On December 1, 2022 it was announced that the National Geographic Channel and Nat Geo Wild would be dropped from Sky Deutschland by the end of January 2023. The channels will however remain active in other german TV operators.

Audience share

References

External links
 

Germany
Television stations in Germany
Television stations in Austria
Television stations in Switzerland
Television channels and stations established in 2004
2004 establishments in Germany
German-language television stations
Mass media in Munich